Mosaic is the twelfth studio album by the American rock band 311. Released on June 23, 2017, it is the band's first album to be released by the label BMG, their first to be produced by John Feldmann, and their fourth to be produced by Scotch Ralston. The track listing was revealed by Pledge Music on April 10, 2017.

Singles
"Too Much to Think" was released as the first official single on March 11, 2017.

"Too Late" was released as the first promotional single on April 13, 2017, and second, "Perfect Mistake," was released on June 9, 2017.

"Too Late" made its radio debut in Los Angeles, California on May 23, 2017 on KLOS.

"'Til the City's on Fire" was released as the second official single on August 8, 2017.

Composition
Sam Mendez at Ultimate Guitar labeled Mosaic as alternative rock and reggae rock. Glenn Gamboa from Newsday characterized it as rap rock.

Reception

Mosaic was well-received upon release, with praise being directed towards a perceived return to peak musical, creative, and conceptual form. In a positive review from AllMusic, author Neil Z. Yeung notes that "it's a triumphant declaration from these vets, a rousing promise that the party has yet to end," giving the album four stars.

Commercial performance
Mosaic debuted at number six on the US Billboard 200 with 39,000 album-equivalent units, of which 37,000 were pure album sales.

Track listing

Personnel
Credits adapted from liner notes.

311
 Nick Hexum – vocals, rhythm guitar, keyboards (uncredited), composition
 Doug "SA" Martinez – vocals, composition
 Tim Mahoney – lead guitar, composition
 P-Nut – bass, composition
 Chad Sexton – drums, mixing (tracks: 2–4, 6, 7, 9, 10, 12–16), composition

Additional personnel
 Nathaniel Caserta – composition (track: 11)
 Zakk Cervini – engineering and mixing (tracks: 1, 5, 8, 11, and 17), composition
 Geoffrey Earley – composition (track: 10)
 John Feldmann – production and recording (tracks: 1, 5, 8, 11, and 17), composition
 Nicole Hexum – composition (track: 13)
 Zack Hexum – composition (track: 13)
 Joe Gastwirt – mastering
 Alan Hampton – backing vocals (track: 11), composition
 Gabe Isaac – composition (tracks: 2, 3, and 6)
 Dillon Pace – composition (track: 7)
 Matt Pauling – additional production and engineering (tracks: 1, 5, 8, 11, and 17), composition
 Scotch Ralston – production and recording (tracks: 2–4, 6, 7, 9, 10, 12–16), composition
 Evan Taubenfeld – composition (track: 7)

Charts

Weekly charts

Year-end charts

References

2017 albums
311 (band) albums
Albums produced by John Feldmann